Malesia is a biogeographical region straddling the Equator and the boundaries of the Indomalayan and Australasian realms, and also a phytogeographical floristic region in the Paleotropical Kingdom. It has been given different definitions. The World Geographical Scheme for Recording Plant Distributions split off Papuasia in its 2001 version.

Floristic province 
Malesia was first identified as a floristic region that included the Malay Peninsula, the Malay Archipelago, New Guinea, and the Bismarck Archipelago, based on a shared tropical flora derived mostly from Asia but also with numerous elements of the Antarctic flora, including many species in the southern conifer families Podocarpaceae and Araucariaceae. The floristic region overlaps four distinct mammalian faunal regions.

The first edition of the World Geographical Scheme for Recording Plant Distributions (WGSRPD) used this definition, but in the second edition of 2001, New Guinea and the Bismarck Archipelago were removed from Malesia and were united with the Solomon Islands, previously placed in the WGSRPD's Southwestern Pacific region, being placed into a new region, Papuasia.

Sundaland 

The western part of Malesia, which includes the Malay Peninsula and the islands of Sumatra, Java, Bali, and Borneo, shares the large mammal fauna of Asia and is known as Sundaland. These islands are on Asia's relatively shallow continental shelf, and were linked to Asia during the ice ages, when sea levels were lower. The eastern edge of Sundaland is the Wallace line, named after Alfred Russel Wallace, the nineteenth-century British naturalist who noted the difference in fauna between islands on either side of the line.

Dipterocarps are predominant trees in the lowland forests of Sundaland. Sundaland has the greatest diversity of Dipterocarp species, with 10 to 14 native genera and approximately 450 native species, including approximately 267 species on Borneo, 155 on the Malay Peninsula, and 106 on Sumatra.

Philippines 

Most of the Philippines were never connected to the Asian mainland, and have a largely Asian-derived flora, and a distinct mammalian fauna.

The Philippines have approximately 50 species of Dipterocarps in 11 genera.

Wallacea 

The islands between Sundaland and New Guinea, called Wallacea, were never linked to the neighboring continents, and have a flora and fauna that include Indomalayan and Australasian elements.

Dipterocarps, which are dominant in Sundaland, are less common in Wallacea, with only 13 species in 4 genera.

New Guinea and the Bismarck Archipelago (Sahulland) 
Together with the Solomon Islands, New Guinea and the Bismarck Archipelago are placed in Papuasia rather than Malesia in the second version of the WGSRPD. The eastern end of the earlier definition of Malesia, which includes New Guinea and the Aru Islands of eastern Indonesia, is linked to Australia by a shallow continental shelf, and shares many marsupial mammal and bird taxa with Australia. New Guinea also has many additional elements of the Antarctic flora, including southern beech (Nothofagus) and eucalypts. New Guinea has the highest mountains in Malesia and Papuasia, and vegetation ranges from tropical lowland forest to tundra.

Assembly and origins of the Malesian flora 
Major contributions to rainforest assembly have come from floristic elements which were carried on the Indian Plate and montane elements which have come from the Australian Plate (Sahul). The Sahul component is now understood to include substantial two-way exchanges with Sunda inclusive of lowland taxa. Evidence for the relative contributions of the great Asiatic floristic interchanges (GAFIs) with India and Sahul, respectively, to the flora of Malesia comes from contemporary lineage distributions, the fossil record, time-calibrated phylogenies, functional traits, and the spatial structure of genetic diversity. Functional trait and biome conservatism are noted features of montane austral lineages from Sahul (e.g., diverse Podocarpaceae), whereas the abundance and diversity of lowland lineages, including groups such as Syzygium (Myrtaceae) and the Asian dipterocarps (Dipterocarpoideae), reflect a less well understood combination of dispersal, ecology, and adaptive radiations. Thus, Malesian rainforest assembly has been shaped by sharply contrasting evolutionary origins and biogeographic histories.

See also 
 Nusantara
 Phytochorion - floristic regions and provinces
 Coral Triangle
 Wallacea

References

External links 
 
 

 
Australasian realm
Indomalayan realm
Paleotropical flora
Floristic regions